Friction, the third and final album (until 2013) by Coney Hatch, was released in 1985. Drummer Dave Ketchum left prior to this release, to be replaced by Barry Connors, formerly of Toronto.

Track listing
This Ain't Love 4:07
She's Gone 3:58
Wrong Side Of Town 3:20
Girl From Last Night's Dream 4:04
Coming To Get You 3:48
Fantasy 4:17
He's A Champion 4:40 
State Line 4:03
Burning Love 3:59
Fuel For The Fire 4:07
"Fuel For the Fire" is a B-side to a British single.

Personnel
 Carl Dixon – rhythm guitar, lead vocals
 Andy Curran – bass guitar, lead vocals on "Wrong Side of Town"
 Steve Shelski – lead guitar, vocals
 Barry Connors – drums, percussion

 Max Norman – Producer, Engineer

 Michael Kaye – Guitar, Bass Technician

1985 albums
Coney Hatch albums
Albums produced by Max Norman